The  is a type of 4-6-4 steam locomotive designed by Hideo Shima and built by the Japanese National Railways (JNR). The "C" classification indicates three sets of driving wheels. The C62 was rebuilt with the boilers of older Class D52 2-8-2 locomotives.

History
Only South Africa operated more powerful Cape gauge locomotives. Forty-nine C62s were built from 1948 to 1949. The last examples in regular service were withdrawn in 1973.

A C62 locomotive, C62 17, broke the speed record for a narrow-gauge steam locomotive on 15 December 1954 when it reached  on the Tōkaidō Main Line. This locomotive was preserved in a park in Nagoya, and later moved to the SCMaglev and Railway Park in Nagoya.

In popular culture
The C62 has achieved a level of fame due in part to the manga/anime series Galaxy Express 999, in which the express is pulled by an advanced space locomotive that is built to replicate a C62.

The founders of Hudson Soft, rail fan brothers Yuji and Hiroshi Kudo, were fond of the C62 and other 4-6-4 locomotives, so they named their company after the wheel arrangement's Hudson nickname. Japan picked up the term from the USA (where the first 4-6-4 built was named after the Hudson River), the C60, C61, and C62 used many American design elements and conventions in their designs, apparently including class names.  Hudson Soft also named a number of products after the C62, including the development kit for the PC Engine, and a chip (Hu62) that was used in a later version of the hardware. It was also the code name for their console before they settled on PC Engine.

A C62 called Mr C6 is seen in Yamataro Comes Back.

Preserved examples
, five Class C62 locomotives were preserved at various locations around the country.

 C62 1 (formerly D52 74): Preserved at the Kyoto Railway Museum in Kyoto
 C62 2 (formerly D52 455): Preserved in working order by JR West at the Kyoto Railway Museum This locomotive wears a stainless steel swallow on its smoke deflector as a reminder of the era when it hauled the famous Tsubame express.
 C62 3 (formerly D52 458): Preserved at JR Hokkaido's Naebo Works in Sapporo, Hokkaido
 C62 17 (formerly D52 69): On display at the SCMaglev and Railway Park in Nagoya
 C62 26 (formerly D52 46): On display at the Kyoto Railway Museum

See also
Japan Railways locomotive numbering and classification
JNR Class C60
JNR Class C61

References

4-6-4 locomotives
Steam locomotives of Japan
1067 mm gauge locomotives of Japan
Preserved steam locomotives of Japan
Railway locomotives introduced in 1948
Passenger locomotives